Agneta Monica Andersson (born 25 April 1961) is a Swedish former sprint canoer who competed from the early 1980s to the late 1990s. Competing in five Summer Olympics, she won seven medals with three gold (K-1 500 m: 1984, K-2 500 m: 1984, 1996), two silvers (K-4 500 m: 1984, K-2 500 m: 1992), and two bronzes (K-4 500 m: 1992, 1996).

Andersson was awarded the Svenska Dagbladet Gold Medal in 1996, jointly with Susanne Gunnarsson.

She also won eleven medals at the ICF Canoe Sprint World Championships with a gold (K-2 500 m: 1993), three silvers (K-1 500 m: 1982, K-2 500 m: 1981, K-4 500 m: 1993), and seven bronzes (K-1 500 m: 1981, 1985, 1987; K-2 500 m: 1982, 1983, 1985, 1991).

References

Sources 

1961 births
Living people
People from Karlskoga Municipality
Canoeists at the 1980 Summer Olympics
Canoeists at the 1984 Summer Olympics
Canoeists at the 1988 Summer Olympics
Canoeists at the 1992 Summer Olympics
Canoeists at the 1996 Summer Olympics
Olympic canoeists of Sweden
Olympic gold medalists for Sweden
Olympic silver medalists for Sweden
Olympic bronze medalists for Sweden
Swedish female canoeists
Olympic medalists in canoeing
ICF Canoe Sprint World Championships medalists in kayak
Medalists at the 1996 Summer Olympics
Medalists at the 1992 Summer Olympics
Medalists at the 1984 Summer Olympics
Sportspeople from Örebro County